Michael Premo is an artist who lives in Brooklyn. He played a significant role in Occupy Wall Street and Occupy Sandy's hurricane response effort.

Work 
On October 30, 2012, one day after Hurricane Sandy hit the New York region, Premo and three friends drove to the Red Hook Initiative and subsequently created Occupy Sandy after posting a note on Inner Occupy. Sandy Storyline, a participatory documentary co-directed by Premo, grew out of the Occupy Sandy relief effort to collect and share stories about the impact of Hurricane Sandy on neighborhoods, communities and lives. Sandy Storyline won the inaugural Transmedia award at the 2013 Tribeca Film Festival.

Also in 2012, Premo was an organizer in New York for Occupy Our Homes, which protested at housing auctions to support those affected by a foreclosure crisis during that era.

In March 2013, Premo was found not guilty in the first jury trial stemming from an Occupy Wall Street protest. Premo was arrested on December 17, 2011 and charged with assaulting an NYPD officer. Prosecutors argued and the arresting officer gave sworn testimony that Premo "charged the police like a linebacker, taking out a lieutenant and resisting arrest so forcefully that he fractured an officer's bone." The defense located a video taken by freelancer Jon Gerberg which contradicted the sworn testimony, instead showing officers "tackling [Premo] as he attempted to get back on his feet." Prosecutors claimed no video of Premo's arrest existed, yet the Gerberg video clearly showed an NYPD officer also filming Premo's arrest. One author wrote that "information provided by the NYPD in the trial was fabricated to such a degree that the allegations made by the police officers have turned out to be quite literally the opposite of what actually happened."

In 2017, Premo directed a 22-minute film, titled Water Warriors. The film showed at the Tribeca Festival in April 2017. The film had its U.S broadcast premiere on PBS by POV

Works

See also 
 The Civilians
 Storycorps

References

External links 
 

Year of birth missing (living people)
Living people
Occupy Wall Street
American political activists
People from Bedford–Stuyvesant, Brooklyn